Gordon Victor Frederick (September 19, 1924 – September 19, 2000) was an American politician. He served as a Democratic member of the Florida House of Representatives.

Frederick was born in Sanford, Florida, and attended Stetson University. In 1956, he won the election for an office of the Florida House of Representatives, succeeding Voilie A. Williams Jr. He served along with Mack Cleveland. In 1962, Frederick was succeeded by S. J. "Joe" David Jr. for the office. He died on his 76th birthday in Orlando, Florida. Frederick was buried in Oaklawn Memorial Park.

References 

1924 births
2000 deaths
People from Sanford, Florida
Democratic Party members of the Florida House of Representatives
20th-century American politicians
Burials in Florida
Stetson University alumni